In mathematics, Waraszkiewicz spirals are subsets of the plane introduced by . Waraszkiewicz spirals give an example of an uncountable family of pairwise incomparable continua, meaning that there is no continuous map from one onto another.

References

Topology